Jean-Louis Georgelin (born 30 August 1948 in Aspet, Haute-Garonne) is a French Army General who was Chief of the Defence Staff ("Chef d'état-major des armées", CEMA) between 4 October 2006 and 25 February 2010. Since 9 June 2010, he has served as Great Chancellor of the French national order, the Légion d'honneur.

Biography 
After nine years at the Prytanée National Militaire, Georgelin joined Saint-Cyr in 1967. As a lieutenant, he was Chef de Section (Platoon Commander) at the École d'application de l'infanterie (Infantry School) from 1975 to 1976, responsible for the training of non-commissioned officers. He served with the 153rd infantry regiment as a Captain.

As a "Commandant"(Major), he graduated from the United States Army Command and General Staff College at Fort Leavenworth and then from the Institute of Higher National Defence Studies (IHEDN) in Paris.

From 1985 to 1988, as a Lieutenant-colonel, he was in charge of a class at Saint-Cyr (promotion Cadets de la France Libre). He then served at the chief of staff of the Army at the financial department from 1988 to 1991. He was aid to the chief of cabinet of the Prime Minister from 1994 to 1997. From 1998 and 2002 he served at the general staff of the Army, directing the  "plans, programmes and evaluations" division.

Georgelin was personal chief of staff of President Jacques Chirac from 25 October 2002 to 4 October 2006. Promoted  to général d'armée the 3d October 2003.

He was promoted to Chief of the Defence Staff by the ministerial council of 20 August 2006. He became the Great Chancellor of the French national order of the Legion of honor by the ministerial council of 9 June 2010.

On 17 April 2019 Georgelin was appointed as special representative to oversee the reconstruction of Notre-Dame-de-Paris after it was severely damaged by fire.

Honours 
 French Parachutist Badge
 Grand Cross of the Légion d'Honneur (France)
 Grand Cross of the Ordre national du Mérite (France)
 French Order of Academic Palms, Commander
 French Order of Arts and Letters, Commander
 French commemorative medal
 NATO Medal for the former Yugoslavia with bar
 Order of Merit of the Federal Republic of Germany, Commander's Cross
 Commander of the US Legion of Merit
 Sash of the Order of the Aztec Eagle (Mexico)
 Order pro Merito Melitensi (Order of Merit of the Sovereign Military Order of Malta), Grand Cross with swords
 Equestrian Order of the Holy Sepulchre of Jerusalem, Cross of Merit with Gold Star (Holy See)
 Distinguished Service Order (Military), Singapore
 Order of Excellence, Grand Cross (Pakistan)
 Order of Bernardo O'Higgins, Grand Cross (Chile)
 Order of King Abdulaziz, Grand Officer (Saudi Arabia)
 Order of Aviz, Grand Officer (Portugal)
 Order of Saint-Charles, Grand Officer (Monaco)
 Order of Merit of the Italian Republic, Grand Officer (Italy)
 Military Order of Morocco, 2nd class
 Order of the British Empire, Honorary Knight Commander (Military)
 Order of Isabella the Catholic, Commander (Spain)
 Order of Léopold, Commander (Belgium)
 Order of the Crown, Commander (Belgium)
 Order of Merit of the Republic of Hungary, Commander
 Order of the Southern Cross, Commander (Brazil)
 Order of Merit of the Central African Republic, Commander
 National Order of Merit of Benin, Commander
 National Order of Mali, Commander
 National Order of Niger, Commander
 National Order of Chad, Commander
 Order of Merit of the Republic of Poland, Commander
 Order of Valour, Commander (Cameroon)

External links 
  Biographie du Général d'armée Jean-Louis Georgelin, grand chancelier de la Légion d'honneur
  French national Order of Legion of Honnor, official website
   – Biographie du CEMA
  Article du journal Libération
  Discours du chef d'état-major des armées
  Visite officielle du CEMA aux Etats-Unis

Notes

1948 births
Living people
People from Haute-Garonne
École Spéciale Militaire de Saint-Cyr alumni
French generals
Grand Chanceliers of the Légion d'honneur
Grand Croix of the Légion d'honneur
Grand Cross of the Ordre national du Mérite
Commandeurs of the Ordre des Arts et des Lettres
Commanders of the Legion of Merit
Commanders Crosses of the Order of Merit of the Federal Republic of Germany
Grand Officers of the Order of Merit of the Italian Republic
Grand Officers of the Order of Saint-Charles
Commanders of the Order of the Crown (Belgium)
Honorary Knights Commander of the Order of the British Empire
Commanders of the Order of Isabella the Catholic
Grand Officers of the Order of Aviz
Recipients of the Order of Merit of the Republic of Hungary
Commanders of the National Order of Mali
Recipients of the Order of Merit of the Republic of Poland
Recipients of the Order of Valour
Recipients of the Order pro Merito Melitensi